Papaqucha may refer to:

 Papaqucha (Huancavelica), a lake in Peru
 Papaqucha (Lima), a lake in Peru